Sokolovsky is a rural locality (a khutor) in Tishanskoye Rural Settlement, Nekhayevsky District, Volgograd Oblast, Russia. The population was 143 as of 2010. There are 7 streets.

Geography 
Sokolovsky is located on the bank of the Tishanka River, 9 km southeast of Nekhayevskaya (the district's administrative centre) by road. Mazinsky is the nearest rural locality.

References 

Rural localities in Nekhayevsky District